American Masters is a PBS television series which produces biographies on enduring writers, musicians, visual and performing artists, dramatists, filmmakers, and those who have left an indelible impression on the cultural landscape of the United States. It is produced by WNET in New York City. The show debuted on PBS in 1986.

Groups or organizations featured include: Actors Studio, Algonquin Round Table, Group Theatre, Sweet Honey in the Rock, Women of Tin Pan Alley, Negro Ensemble Company, Juilliard School, the Beat Generation, the singer-songwriters of the 1970s, Sun Records, vaudeville, and Warner Bros.

History
American Masters, a series "devoted to America's 'greatest native-born and adopted' artists", was originally scheduled to premiere in September 1985; for "logistical scheduling reasons" the premiere was delayed until summer 1986, though on October 16, 1985, an American Masters "special" called Aaron Copland: A Self-Portrait was aired.

The first of the 15 first-season episodes was Private Conversations,  a "cinema-verite documentary by Christian Blackwood done in that trickiest of cinematic forms: a film about a film, in this instance the television version of Death of a Salesman, directed by Volker Schlöndorff". It aired on June 23, 1986, as one of two episodes not specifically commissioned for the show's first season.

Susan Lacy, American Masters creator and former executive producer, selected each subject, matched them to the specific filmmakers, and oversaw a first-season budget of $8 million. Before creating the series Lacy had been the senior programmer for Great Performances and one of the "architects" of American Playhouse, having written the original proposal for the latter. At the time of the show's premiere, she was also the East Coast head of the Sundance Institute.

In 2014, Michael Kantor succeeded Lacy as executive producer.  As an independent producer, Kantor had directed one American Masters episode (Quincy Jones: In the Pocket, season 16, episode 4) and produced and directed the Emmy Award-winning series, Broadway: The American Musical and Make 'Em Laugh: The Funny Business of America with WNET.  As head of the American Masters series, Kantor created the American Masters podcast in 2016 and the theatrical imprint, American Masters Pictures, in 2016, which brought ten films to the Sundance Film Festival over a period of five years.

After the show's first two seasons, American Masters began producing most of its episodes; in those cases, it hires directors, arranges for funding, manages the budget, and supervises the editing; the show reserves the right to make the final cut on every film it produces. The American Masters production company occasionally plays a more limited role and co-produces some of its episodes, such as the 2005 documentary on Bob Dylan, No Direction Home, and then in 2010 The Doors, When You're Strange.

Episodes

Reception 
Jevon Phillips of Los Angeles Times called the episode "Amy Tan: Unintended Memoir", "Fantastic."

References

External links
 
PBS: American Masters
 

Television series by WNET
Lists of American people
PBS original programming
1986 American television series debuts
1980s American documentary television series
1990s American documentary television series
2000s American documentary television series
2010s American documentary television series
English-language television shows
Peabody Award-winning television programs